Trapstar might refer to one of the following:

"Trapstar", a song on Nivea's album Animalistic
"Trapstar", a song on Lil Mosey's album Northsbest
"Trap Star", a song on Young Jeezy's album Let's Get It: Thug Motivation 101